WIRmachenDRUCK Arena is a football stadium in Aspach, Germany. The stadium was opened in August 2011, and has a capacity of 10,000, with 6,500 seats all covered with roofs. The stadium was built using funds from twelve investors, including singer Andrea Berg.

It is the home stadium of SG Sonnenhof Großaspach. It can be used also for music concerts, able to support 15,000 capacity. The record attendance for a football match was broken in a Regionalliga promotion playoff match, against VfL Wolfsburg II on 28 May 2014, with 5,798 spectators.

References

External links
 WIRmachenDRUCK Arena at sg94.de
 WIRmachenDRUCK Arena at weltfussball.de
 WIRmachenDRUCK Arena at europlan-online.de

Football venues in Germany
Buildings and structures in Baden-Württemberg
Sports venues in Baden-Württemberg
SG Sonnenhof Großaspach